Janette Sadik-Khan (born April 28, 1961) is a former commissioner of the New York City Department of Transportation (2007–2013) and an advisor on transportation and urban issues. She works for Bloomberg Associates, a philanthropic consultancy established by former Mayor Michael R. Bloomberg that advises mayors around the world to improve the quality of life for their residents. She serves as chairperson for the National Association of City Transportation Officials (NACTO), a coalition of the transportation departments of 40 large cities nationwide.

Early life and education 
Sadik-Khan was born in San Francisco, California, and moved to New York City as a child. She is the daughter of Orhan Idris Sadik-Khan (1929-2007), managing director of UBS Paine Webber, and his first wife Jane McCarthy, an environmental pioneer, one of the founders of Citizens for Clean Air in NYC, an urban preservationist, Chief Administrator Officer at the Municipal Art Society, and currently an advocate for criminal justice reform. Orhan Sadik-Khan was born in Finland, and grew up in Berlin and Cairo, son of Afghan parents; his father was an imam, and his mother a paediatrician.

She holds a B.A. in Political Science from Occidental College in Los Angeles, California, and a J.D. from Columbia University School of Law.

Career
Sadik-Khan worked in the New York City Department of Transportation during the administration of David Dinkins and became the mayor's transportation advisor. Sadik-Khan subsequently worked as deputy administrator of the Federal Transit Administration at the United States Department of Transportation in Washington, D.C. under President Bill Clinton, and she was a senior vice president at Parsons Brinckerhoff, an international transportation engineering firm.

NYC DOT 
Sadik-Khan was appointed transportation commissioner by New York City Mayor Michael Bloomberg in 2007 and served in that role until 2013. Her tenure was marked by significant changes to New York City streets and public spaces, including the conversion of road space into bike lanes and into pedestrian plazas, notably along Broadway at Times Square and Herald Square. Called a "bicycle visionary" by the New York Times, "equal parts Jane Jacobs and Robert Moses," by New York magazine, and one of "The Most Innovative and Practical Thinkers of Our Time" by Slate, Sadik-Khan oversaw the building of nearly 400 miles of bike lanes and more than 60 pedestrian plazas in New York City, and she worked with the Metropolitan Transportation Authority to create seven rapid bus routes across the city. She led the creation of Citi Bike, a bike share network of 6,000 bikes—the nation's largest—which has since been expanded to 12,000 bikes in three boroughs. Over her six and a half years in office, approximately 180 acres of former New York City road space for motor vehicles was converted to use by bicycles and pedestrians, and another 44 acres designated as bus-only lanes.

Sadik-Khan's time in office was also marked by media controversy over her policies, and encountered sometimes vocal opposition. The transportation department was sued over the placement of bike lanes and bike share racks, and some projects were criticized in the news media. Despite the controversy, the bike lane, plaza and bike share programs that Sadik-Khan introduced were consistently supported in citywide polls by majorities of New Yorkers, and all lawsuits were ultimately dismissed or have yet to lead to the removal of any lane.

Bloomberg Associates 
At Bloomberg Associates, she advises city mayors on transportation practices, including in Los Angeles, Mexico City, Rio de Janeiro, Oakland and Athens, and she speaks at international forums.

Author
She is the author of the book "Streetfight: Handbook for an Urban Revolution," based on her experience as commissioner and her new role as global transportation advisor.

Honors, awards and associations

Awards 
 2011 Jane Jacobs Medal for New Ideas and Activism, Rockefeller Foundation
 2012 Rachel Carson Award, National Audubon Society
 2013 Design Patron Award, Smithsonian Cooper-Hewitt, National Design Museum
 2012 George S. Lewis Award, American Institute of Architects
 2012–2013 Lawrence M. Orton Award, American Planning Association
 2011/2012 Edmund N. Bacon Memorial Award, Philadelphia Center for Architecture
 2012 Smart Solution Spotlight Award, ITS America

Personal life
She is married to Mark Geistfeld, a professor at New York University School of Law, with whom she has one child.

References

External links

 
 Streetfight: Handbook for an Urban Revolution, written by Janette Sadik-Khan and Seth Sololomonow
 Profile at Bloomberg Associates
 Archived biography of Commissioner Sadik-Khan from NYC.gov
 

1960 births
American civil servants
American people of Afghan descent
Columbia Law School alumni
Commissioners in New York City
Living people
Occidental College alumni
Place of birth missing (living people)
Women in New York (state) politics
Sustainable transport pioneers
21st-century American women